Shandongornis is an extinct genus of pheasants that lived during the Miocene within Shandong province, China.

List of species 
S. shanwangensis
S. yinanensis

References 

Prehistoric birds of Asia
Phasianidae
Miocene birds